Maharlu Now (also Romanized as Mahārlū Now; also known as Maharin and Mahārlū) is a village in Maharlu Rural District, Kuhenjan District, Sarvestan County, Fars Province, Iran. At the 2006 census, its population was 2,168, in 544 families.

References 

Populated places in Sarvestan County